The 1961 Greenville 200 was a NASCAR Grand National Series event that was held on April 1, 1961, at Greenville-Pickens Speedway in Greenville, South Carolina.

Race report
After nearly two hours of racing 200 laps, Emanuel Zervakis emerged as the winner as he managed to defeat Richard Petty by an unknown margin in front of a crowd of 5000 people. This would make the first of two career victories for Zervakis and the only time that a driver with the number 85 to have two career victories in NASCAR Cup Series history. All 21 of the drivers on the grid were American-born males. Doug Yates would receive the last-place finish due to a driveshaft issue on the eighth lap. Other notable names who competed were: Junior Johnson, Roy Tyner, and Ned Jarrett. Johnson would qualify for the pole position with speeds up to  during the qualifying sessions. Four cautions slowed the race for 20 laps; there was only one crash during the entire race.

Bob Barron was a middle-aged rookie who started in 20th place and finished in 18th place. After the 1961 NASCAR Grand National Series season, Barron attempted to do only one more NASCAR Cup Series race while making attempts to look into it further.

Zervakis would make his first win in his NASCAR career at this racing event. Bud Allman was one of the notable crew chiefs at the race; he worked on Ned Jarrett's #11 Ford vehicle.

The transition to purpose-built racecars began in the early 1960s and occurred gradually over that decade.  Changes made to the sport by the late 1960s brought an end to the "strictly stock" vehicles of the 1950s.

Qualifying

Finishing order
Section reference:

 Emanuel Zervakis (No. 85)
 Richard Petty (No. 43)
 Rex White (No. 4)
 G.C. Spencer (No. 48)
 Buck Baker (No. 86)
 Jimmy Pardue (No. 54)
 Fred Harb (No. 17)
 George Green (No. 35)
 Bobby Waddell (No. 0)
 David Pearson (No. 67)
 Curtis Crider (No. 62)
 Doug Cox (No. 30)
 Herman Beam (No. 19)
 Ned Jarrett (No. 11)
 Roy Tyner (No. 9)
 Junior Johnson (No. 27)
 Tommy Irwin (No. 2)
 Bob Barron (No. 71)
 Jack Smith (No. 47)
 Paul Lewis (No. 1)
 Doug Yates (No. 23)

Timeline
Section reference:
 Start of race: Junior Johnson started the race with the pole position.
 Lap 8: Doug Yates had troubles with his driveshaft, making him the last-place finisher.
 Lap 33: Paul Lewis suffered a terminal crash, forcing him to leave the event prematurely.
 Lap 49: Jack Smith's engine blew in his racing vehicle.
 Lap 54: Bob Barron's vehicle had a faulty clutch.
 Lap 68: Tommy Irwin's problematic steering caused him to exit the race prematurely.
 Lap 69: Junior Johnson developed fuel pump problems on this lap, ending his day on the track.
 Lap 70: Rex White takes over the lead from Junior Johnson.
 Lap 99: Roy Tyner had to leave the race due to transmission issues.
 Lap 100: Ned Jarrett managed to overheat his vehicle, causing his early departure from the race.
 Lap 149: Axle problems forced Herman Bean to drop out of the race.
 Lap 176: Emanuel Zervakis takes over the lead from Rex White.
 Lap 181: David Pearson ran out of gasoline, causing him to exit the race.
 Finish: Emanuel Zervakis was officially declared the winner of the event.

References

Greenville 200
Greenville 200
NASCAR races at Greenville-Pickens Speedway